NA-185 Dera Ghazi Khan-I is newly-created a constituency for the National Assembly of Pakistan. It mainly comprises the city of Dera Ghazi Khan which was in the old NA-172 before the 2018 delimitations.

2018 general election 

General elections are scheduled to be held on 25 July 2018.

By-election 2023 
A by-election will be held on 16 March 2023 due to the resignation of Zartaj Gul, the previous MNA from this seat.

See also
NA-184 Taunsa-cum-Dera Ghazi Khan
NA-186 Dera Ghazi Khan-II

References 

Dera Ghazi Khan